was a , also known as Kampō, after Genbun and before Enkyō. This period spanned the years from February 1741 through February 1744.

Change of era
 1741 : Based on the belief in Chinese astrology that the 58th year of the sexagenary cycle brings changes, the era name was changed to Kanpō (meaning "Keeping Lenient and Generous"). The previous era ended and the new one commenced in Genbun 6, on the 27th day of the 2nd month.

Events of the Kanpō era
 1742 (Kanpō 2): A comet was seen in the sky.
 1742 (Kanpō 2, 8th month): Persistent heavy rains create floods throughout the country, with noteworthy devastation in Musashi province, Kōzuke province, Shimotsuke province, and Shinano province. In Heian-kyō, the Sanjo Bridge is washed away in this destructive storm cycle.
 1743 (Kanpō 3, 11th month): A comet was sighted in the night sky; and this comet is likely to have been what is today identified as C/1743 X1 (De-Cheseaux).

Notes

References
 Nussbaum, Louis Frédéric and Käthe Roth. (2005). Japan Encyclopedia. Cambridge: Harvard University Press. ; OCLC 48943301
 Ponsonby-Fane, Richard Arthur Brabazon. (1956). Kyoto: The Old Capital of Japan, 794-1869. Kyoto: Ponsonby Memorial Society. 
 Screech, Timon. (2006). Secret Memoirs of the Shoguns: Isaac Titsingh and Japan, 1779-1822. London: RoutledgeCurzon. ; OCLC 65177072
 Titsingh, Isaac. (1834). Nihon Odai Ichiran; ou, Annales des empereurs du Japon.  Paris: Royal Asiatic Society, Oriental Translation Fund of Great Britain and Ireland. OCLC 5850691.
 Zhuang, T. S. (1988). Acta Astronomica Sinica, v29:2, p. 208, "Comet De-Cheseaux as Observed in China in 1743-44".

External links
 National Diet Library, "The Japanese Calendar" -- historical overview plus illustrative images from library's collection

Japanese eras
1740s in Japan